This is a list of Conservative Members of Parliament (MPs) elected to the House of Commons of the United Kingdom for the 55th Parliament of the United Kingdom.

 MPs 
 Adam Afriyie
 Adam Holloway
 Aidan Burley
 Alan Duncan
 Alan Haselhurst
 Alec Shelbrooke
 Alistair Burt
 Alok Sharma
 Alun Cairns
 Amber Rudd
 Andrea Leadsom
 Andrew Bingham
 Andrew Bridgen
 Andrew Griffiths
 Andrew Jones
 Andrew Lansley
 Andrew Mitchell
 Andrew Murrison
 Andrew Percy
 Andrew Robathan
 Andrew Rosindell
 Andrew Selous
 Andrew Stephenson
 Andrew Turner
 Andrew Tyrie
 Angela Watkinson
 Angie Bray
 Anna Soubry
 Anne Main
 Anne Marie Morris
 Anne McIntosh
 Anne Milton
 Ben Gummer
 Ben Wallace
 Bernard Jenkin
 Bill Cash
 Bill Wiggin
 Bob Blackman
 Bob Neill
 Bob Stewart
 Brandon Lewis
 Brian Binley
 Brooks Newmark
 Caroline Dinenage
 Caroline Nokes
 Caroline Spelman
 Charles Hendry
 Charles Walker
 Charlie Elphicke
 Charlotte Leslie
 Cheryl Gillan
 Chloe Smith
 Chris Grayling
 Chris Heaton-Harris
 Chris Kelly
 Chris Skidmore
 Chris White
 Christopher Chope
 Christopher Pincher
 Claire Perry
 Conor Burns
 Craig Whittaker
 Crispin Blunt
 Damian Collins
 Damian Green
 Damian Hinds
 Dan Byles
 Daniel Kawczynski
 Dan Poulter
 David Amess
 David Burrowes
 David Cameron
 David Davies
 David Davis
 David Evennett
 David Gauke
 David Jones
 David Lidington
 David Morris
 David Mowat
 David Mundell
 David Nuttall
 David Ruffley
 David Rutley
 David Tredinnick
 David Willetts
 Desmond Swayne
 Dominic Grieve
 Dominic Raab
 Douglas Carswell
 Ed Vaizey
 Edward Garnier
 Edward Leigh
 Edward Timpson
 Eleanor Laing
 Eric Ollerenshaw
 Eric Pickles
 Esther McVey
 Fiona Bruce
 Francis Maude
 Gareth Johnson
 Gary Streeter
 Gavin Barwell
 Gavin Williamson
 Geoffrey Clifton-Brown
 Geoffrey Cox
 George Eustice
 George Freeman
 George Hollingbery
 George Osborne
 Gerald Howarth
 Glyn Davies
 Gordon Henderson
 Graham Brady
 Graham Evans
 Graham Stuart
 Grant Shapps
 Greg Clark
 Greg Hands
 Greg Knight
 Gregory Barker
 Guto Bebb
 Guy Opperman
 Harriett Baldwin
 Heather Wheeler
 Helen Grant
 Henry Bellingham
 Henry Smith
 Hugh Robertson
 Hugo Swire
 Iain Duncan Smith
 Iain Stewart
 Ian Liddell-Grainger
 Jack Lopresti
 Jackie Doyle-Price
 Jacob Rees-Mogg
 Jake Berry
 James Arbuthnot
 James Brokenshire
 James Clappison
 James Duddridge
 James Gray
 James Morris
 James Paice
 James Wharton
 Jane Ellison
 Jason McCartney
 Jeremy Hunt
 Jeremy Lefroy
 Jeremy Wright
 Jesse Norman
 Jessica Lee
 Jo Johnson
 John Baron
 John Glen
 John Henry Hayes
 John Howell
 John Penrose
 John Randall
 John Redwood
 John Stanley
 John Stevenson
 John Whittingdale
 Jonathan Djanogly
 Jonathan Evans
 Jonathan Lord
 Julian Brazier
 Julian Lewis
 Julian Smith
 Julian Sturdy
 Justin Tomlinson
 Justine Greening
 Karen Bradley
 Karen Lumley
 Karl McCartney
 Keith Simpson
 Kenneth Clarke
 Kris Hopkins
 Kwasi Kwarteng
 Laura Sandys
 Laurence Robertson
 Lee Scott
 Liam Fox
 Liz Truss
 Lorraine Fullbrook
 Louise Mensch
 Malcolm Rifkind
 Marcus Jones
 Margot James
 Maria Miller
 Mark Field
 Mark Francois
 Mark Garnier
 Mark Harper
 Mark Hoban
 Mark Lancaster
 Mark Menzies
 Mark Pawsey
 Mark Prisk
 Mark Pritchard
 Mark Reckless
 Mark Simmonds
 Mark Spencer
 Martin Vickers
 Mary Macleod
 Matthew Hancock
 Matthew Offord
 Mel Stride
 Michael Ellis
 Michael Fabricant
 Michael Fallon
 Michael Gove
 Mike Freer
 Mike Penning
 Mike Weatherley
 Nadhim Zahawi
 Nadine Dorries
 Neil Carmichael
 Neil Parish
 Nicholas Boles
 Nicholas Soames
 Nick Gibb
 Nick Herbert
 Nick Hurd
 Nick de Bois
 Nicky Morgan
 Nicola Blackwood
 Nigel Adams
 Nigel Evans
 Nigel Mills
 Oliver Colvile
 Oliver Heald
 Oliver Letwin
 Owen Paterson
 Patrick McLoughlin
 Patrick Mercer
 Paul Beresford
 Paul Maynard
 Paul Uppal
 Pauline Latham
 Penny Mordaunt
 Peter Aldous
 Peter Bone
 Peter Bottomley
 Peter Lilley
 Peter Luff
 Peter Tapsell
 Philip Davies
 Philip Dunne
 Philip Hammond
 Philip Hollobone
 Phillip Lee
 Priti Patel
 Rebecca Harris
 Rehman Chishti
 Richard Bacon
 Richard Benyon
 Richard Drax
 Richard Fuller
 Richard Graham
 Richard Harrington
 Richard Ottaway
 Richard Shepherd
 Rob Wilson
 Robert Buckland
 Robert Goodwill
 Robert Halfon
 Robert Jenrick
 Robert Syms
 Robert Walter
 Robin Walker
 Roger Gale
 Rory Stewart
 Sajid Javid
 Sam Gyimah
 Sarah Newton
 Sarah Wollaston
 Shailesh Vara
 Shaun Woodward
 Sheryll Murray
 Simon Burns
 Simon Hart
 Simon Kirby
 Simon Reevell
 Sir George Young
 Steve Barclay
 Stephen Crabb
 Stephen Dorrell
 Stephen Hammond
 Stephen McPartland
 Stephen Metcalfe
 Stephen Mosley
 Stephen O'Brien
 Stephen Phillips
 Steve Baker
 Steve Brine
 Stewart Jackson
 Stuart Andrew
 Theresa May
 Theresa Villiers
 Therese Coffey
 Tim Loughton
 Tim Yeo
 Tobias Ellwood
 Tony Baldry
 Tracey Crouch
 William Hague
 Zac Goldsmith

2010-15
Conservative